Ganjali or Ganj Ali may refer to:

 Ganjali, Ardabil
 Ganjali, Lorestan
 Ganjali-e Sofla, Lorestan Province